Anatoliki Argithea ("Eastern Argithea", before 2001: Αθαμάνες - Athamanes) is a former community in the Karditsa regional unit, Thessaly, Greece. Since the 2011 local government reform, it is part of the municipality Argithea, of which it is a municipal unit. The municipal unit has an area of 135.070 km2. Population 908 (2011). The seat of the community was in Petrilo.

References

Populated places in Karditsa (regional unit)